There were 1,318,755 Muslims reported in the 2021 census in the Greater London area. In the 2021 census Office for National Statistics, the proportion of Muslims in London had risen to 15% of the population, making Islam the second largest religion in the city after Christianity.

History

The first Muslims to settle in London were lascars, that is, Bengali and Yemeni sailors from the 19th century. Many Muslims from the Indian sub-continent served in the British Army and British Indian Army in the First and Second World Wars. In the wave of immigration that followed the Second World War, many Muslims emigrated to the UK from these Commonwealth countries and former colonies to satisfy labour shortages and seek new opportunities for themselves. Following the partition of India, many came from Pakistan especially the Punjab and Azad Kashmir in addition to the Indian state of Gujarat. This initial wave of immigration of the 1950s and 60s was followed by migrants from Cyprus, Sylhet in  Bangladesh, formerly East Pakistan. Many Muslims also arrived from various other countries, although the percentage is far smaller than from South Asia. Amongst those from other countries, Muslims from Yemen, Somalia and Turkey have significant numbers, whereas those from Malaysia, Nigeria, Ghana and Kenya represent smaller fractions. Today, London's Muslims come from all over the world and there is a small but growing group of converts.

21st century

Following waves of immigration over the previous decades, London now has one of the most diverse array of Muslim communities in the world. 

London's Muslims are geographically dispersed with settlements principally shaped by earlier patterns of immigration. The greatest concentration can be found in the east London boroughs of Tower Hamlets, Newham and Waltham Forest, where Bangladeshis, Pakistanis, and Indians tend to predominate. 

North London's Muslims are concentrated in the boroughs of Haringey, Islington, and Enfield, with older communities of Turkish Cypriots more recently being joined by Algerians, Somalis, and mainland Turks.

The traditional homeland of London's Arabic-speaking Muslims is in the City of Westminster, with the initial settlement around Edgware Road since spreading to Kensington & Chelsea, Hammersmith & Fulham, Brent, and Ealing. These five boroughs contain the highest proportion of Arabs in the UK, the majority of whom are Muslim - the recent 2021 census put the figure between 3 and 8%. In recent years, refugees and migrants from countries such as Eritrea, Ethiopia, Sudan, Afghanistan, Algeria, Morocco, and Yemen have joined these various communities, in many cases setting up their own mosques, such as the Iqraa Foundation in Harlesden.

Indian and Pakistani Muslims have settled in significant numbers further west in Hounslow and Southall, but in a much smaller proportion to their Hindu and Sikh neighbours.

Muslims are a much smaller minority south of the river, although significant communities of west African Muslims have formed in Peckham, Camberwell and around Old Kent Road, including Nigerians, Ghanaians, and Ivorians. 

As in earlier years, Muslims have often been met with hostility by the local white population. In the years since 9/11 and the invasion of Iraq, nativism has often targeted Muslims in particular, with anti-immigrant sentiments channelled through the lens of Islamophobia. In spite of this context, certain Muslims have been able to rise through the ranks of society, most notably the Mayor of London Sadiq Khan.

In 2013, it was reported there were 13,400 Muslim-owned businesses in London, creating more than 70,000 jobs and representing just over 33% of Small to Medium Enterprises in London.

Notable mosques and other institutions
The mosque is first and foremost a place of prayer. There are estimated to be almost 2,000 mosques and Islamic prayer rooms in the UK, serving 4.1 million Muslims, or 6.3% of the UK population. About 1500 of those Mosques were located in London as of 2016. These mosques in the UK range from humble and small 'house mosques' in residential areas to larger, purpose built mosques such as Regents Park Mosque in London (discussed below).

London's first Mosque opened by Hajie Mohamed Dollie in 1895, Albert Street, modern Camden. Prof. Ron Geeves states this in his biography of Abdullah Quilliam. The Mosque relocates to Euston Road in 1899 where the present Wellcome Collection stands. Mohamed Dollie was of Scottish and Malay ancestry. Furthermore, it is the subject of a forthcoming documentary with Muslim History Tours. Mohamed Dollie died in 1906 and is buried at the New Willesden Cemetery with a new headstone. The West London Islamic Centre was honoured to be part of community-led collaboration with Muslim History Tours,

The first purpose-built mosque in London is in Southfields, Wandsworth. The Fazl Mosque was inaugurated in 1926 as a project of the Ahmadiyya community. Since 1984, the mosque and its surrounding buildings have been the residence of the Khalifatul Masih caliphs and therefore, the international headquarters of the Community.

One of the first large mosques was on Brick Lane, in a listed building which started life as a church in the 18th century and was converted into a synagogue in the 19th, reflecting the changing waves of immigration, from Huguenots to Eastern European Jews to Bengalis. Soon after the Brick Lane Mosque opened, two large mosques were built, the East London Mosque (with the adjoining London Muslim Centre and Maryam Centre) on Whitechapel Road not far from Spitalfields, and the London Central Mosque in Regent's Park.

Other mosques in Inner London include the Brixton Mosque, in the midst of an Afro-Caribbean area, and the Finsbury Park Mosque (also known as the North London Central Mosque).

The Suleymaniye Mosque on Kingsland Road serves a largely Turkish community. Named after the famous landmark in Istanbul, it was purpose-built and opened in 1999. Shacklewell Lane Mosque was the first Turkish mosque in the United Kingdom. It was established by Turkish Cypriots in 1977, also in a converted synagogue. The nearby Aziziye Mosque in Stoke Newington was converted from a cinema.

In Outer London are the Croydon Mosque, the very large Baitul Futuh Mosque in Merton, and the Abbey Mills Mosque in Stratford. Also notable are the Central Mosque Wembley, Leytonstone Mosque, and Harrow Central Mosque.

The Islamic Centre of England is an educational establishment that opened in 1998. London is also home to The Islamic College, a college and university which offers A-levels, BA, and MA degrees in coordination with Middlesex University.

Islamophobia in London 
Police forces recorded 110 hate crimes directed at Muslim places of worship (Mar.-Jul. 2019) This number is up from 47 over the same six-month period in 2016; attacks have doubled over past year. For example, last year, a jury convicted a man of murder after he drove a van into Muslim worshipers outside a London mosque, killing one person and injuring nine others. Overall, the number of anti-Muslim hate crimes reported across Britain increased by 593% after the Christchurch shooting. The British government has been making vast efforts to reduce these deadly attacks.

See also 

 List of British Muslims
 Londonistan
 Islam Expo
 Islam in Birmingham
 Islam in England
 Islam in the United Kingdom
 Muslim Welfare House
 Wembley's Conference of Living Religions 1924
 Religion in England
 Religion in London

References

External links

Reassessing what we collect website – Muslim London History of Muslim London with objects and images
 Subject Guide on Islam in London